For the Summer Olympics, there were 21 venues starting with the letter 'F' and 19 starting with the letter 'G'.

F

G

References

 List F-G